Mily may refer to:

People
 Juraj Milý (born 1996), Slovak ice hockey player
 Mily Balakirev
 Mily Clément
 Mily Possoz (1888–1968),, Portuguese artist
 Mily Sidauy (born 1943), Mexican sculptor
 Mily Treviño-Sauceda (1957–1958), American writer and trade unionist
 Mily-Meyer, French soprano

Places
 Milý, Czech Republic